Victoria Park is a large recreational area on the Port Hills above Christchurch, New Zealand.

Description
The park was formally opened by William Rolleston on 22 June 1897 for the Diamond Jubilee of Queen Victoria.

The park has an information centre, and features open parkland, planted gardens and pine forest, with a variety of walking tracks and a permanent orienteering course.
Mountain biking tracks extend into the adjacent Bowenvale Reserve, and include several challenging downhill routes, including the Nationals Down Hill Track.

The park was the site of the 1954 Parker–Hulme murder that has inspired plays, novels, non-fiction books, and most notably, the Oscar-nominated film Heavenly Creatures.

References

External links

 Up to date information on mountain bike tracks

Tourist attractions in Christchurch
Parks in Christchurch
Protected areas of Canterbury, New Zealand